Japanese football in 2013.

Promotion and relegation

Teams relegated from J. League Division 1
Vissel Kobe
Gamba Osaka
Consadole Sapporo

Teams promoted to J. League Division 1
Ventforet Kofu
Shonan Bellmare
Oita Trinita

Teams relegated from J. League Division 2
Machida Zelvia

Teams promoted to J. League Division 2
V-Varen Nagasaki

J. League Division 1

Sanfrecce Hiroshima won another J. League title, raising its total league titles to seven. Yokohama F. Marinos led the campaign in the latter half of the seasons, only to lose the last two matches to Albirex Niigata and Kawasaki Frontale respectively, thus settling for second place. Frontale won third place as a result of their victory, qualifying for the AFC Champions League for the first time since 2009.

Oita Trinita, who had been promoted via the playoffs as sixth place, showed their poor preparation throughout the campaign and ended in bottom place. Júbilo Iwata was relegated as well after 20 seasons in Division 1, while Shonan Bellmare, who had been promoted with them in 1994 and was making a cameo appearance, went down with them as well.

J. League Division 2

Kansai rivals Gamba Osaka and Vissel Kobe, having been both relegated from Division 1 in the previous season, contested a fierce battle for the second tier title, and Gamba was ultimately victorious. The playoffs were won by Tokushima Vortis, which overcame Kyoto Sanga at Kokuritsu to become the first Shikoku football club to compete in the top Japanese division.

FC Gifu was in bottom place for most of the season before a short burst of rejuvenation in the final weeks allowed them to climb above Gainare Tottori, who was left to face the playout against Kamatamare Sanuki, in what turned out to be their last season in the second tier.

Japan Football League

In spite of leading the table for most of the season, Kamatamare Sanuki slipped and was overtaken by Nagano Parceiro to the title. However, because Nagano did not fulfill the J2 stadium requirements, Sanuki was allowed to playoff against Tottori and won.

This was the last season of the JFL as the third tier of Japanese football, as a new J. League Division 3 will take its place. No club was relegated to the Regional Leagues.

Japanese Regional Leagues

Tōhoku champions Grulla Morioka won the Regional Promotion Series, and owing to meeting J. League Associate Membership requirements, they were allowed to be promoted to the new Division 3 instead of the fourth-tier JFL, which the other three finalists joined.

Domestic cups

Emperor's Cup

J. League Cup

Japanese Super Cup

International club competitions

Suruga Bank Championship

AFC Champions League

National team (Men)

Results

International Friendly (2013 Kirin Challenge Cup)

International Friendly

2014 FIFA World Cup qualification (AFC) Fourth Round

International Friendly (2013 Asian and Japan Love)

2014 FIFA World Cup qualification (AFC) Fourth Round

2014 FIFA World Cup qualification (AFC) Fourth Round

2013 FIFA Confederations Cup

2013 FIFA Confederations Cup

2013 FIFA Confederations Cup

2013 EAFF East Asian Cup

2013 EAFF East Asian Cup

2013 EAFF East Asian Cup

Players statistics

National team (Women)

Results

Players statistics

References

External links

 
Seasons in Japanese football